A hydrogen station is a storage or filling station for Hydrogen. The hydrogen is dispensed by weight. There are two filling pressures in common use. H70 or 700 bar, and the older standard H35 or 350 bar. As of 2021 around 550 filling stations were available worldwide.

Hydrogen filling stations by region and country 
A global map of hydrogen filling stations is available.

Asia
In 2019, there were 178 publicly available hydrogen fuel stations in operation.

Japan

In 2021, there were 137 publicly available hydrogen fuel stations in operation.

Japan built hydrogen filling stations under the JHFC project from 2002 to 2010 to test various technologies of hydrogen generation. By the end of 2012 there were 17 hydrogen stations. A task force led by Yuriko Koike, Japan's former environment minister, and supported by the country's Liberal Democratic Party, was set up in 2016 to oversee the process of building new hydrogen stations.

China
By the end of 2020, China had built 118 hydrogen refueling stations.

South Korea
In 2019, there were 33 publicly available hydrogen fuel stations in operation.

 approximately 18,000 fuel cell electric vehicles (FCEV) had been produced in Korea (domestic demand: 9,000 vehicles).

Europe
In 2019, there were 177 stations in Europe.

Germany
 there are 84 publicly available hydrogen fuel stations in operation.

France
 there are 5 publicly available hydrogen fuel stations in operation.

Iceland
 there are 3 publicly available hydrogen fuel stations in operation.

Italy
 there is one publicly available hydrogen fuel stations in operation.

Netherlands
 there are 4 publicly available hydrogen fuel stations in operation.

Denmark
 there are 6 publicly available hydrogen fuel stations in operation.

Belgium
 there are 2 publicly available hydrogen fuel stations in operation.

Norway
 there are 2 publicly available hydrogen fuel stations in operation, both in the Oslo area. Since the explosion at the hydrogen filling station in Sandvika in June 2019, the sale of hydrogen cars in Norway has halted.

Sweden
 there are 4 publicly available hydrogen fuel stations in operation.

Switzerland
 there are 3 publicly available hydrogen fuel stations in operation.

United Kingdom
 there are 11 publicly available hydrogen fuel stations in operation.

In 2011 the first public hydrogen station opened in Swindon. In 2014 the London Hatton Cross station opened. In 2015, the London Hydrogen Network Expansion project opened the first supermarket-located hydrogen refuelling station at Sainsbury's in Hendon.

As of 2015, there were two publicly accessible hydrogen refuelling stations in Aberdeen.

North America

Canada
As of August 2022, there were 8 fueling stations in Canada, 7 of which were open to public:
 British Columbia: Four stations in the Great Vancouver Area and Vancouver Island. All four stations are operated by HTEC (co-branded with Shell and Esso).
 Ontario: One station in Mississauga, which is operated by Hydrogenics Corporation. The station is only available to certain commercial customers.
 Quebec: Three stations in the Great Montreal area, which is operated by Shell, and one station in Quebec City, operated by Harnois Énergies (co-branded with Esso)..

United States
, there were 54 publicly accessible hydrogen refueling stations in the US, 53 of which were located in California, with one in Hawaii.

Arizona: A prototype hydrogen fuelling station was built in compliance with all of the prevailing safety, environmental and building codes in Phoenix to demonstrate that such fuelling stations could be built in urban areas.  no publicly accessible stations were in operation in Arizona.

California:  there were 53 stations. Hydrogen station development was encouraged and subsidized by the California Fuel Cell Partnership, and under Governor Arnold Schwarzenegger's California Hydrogen Highway program. In 2013, Governor Brown signed AB 8, a bill to fund  up to 100 hydrogen stations.

Hawaii opened its first hydrogen station at Hickam in 2009. In 2012, the Aloha Motor Company opened a hydrogen station in Honolulu.  however, only one publicly accessible station was in operation in Hawaii.

Massachusetts: The French company Air Liquide built a hydrogen fuelling station in Mansfield, Massachusetts in 2018, one of four stations they built as part of an expansion of the hydrogen fuelling infrastructure in the Northeastern U.S. The only other hydrogen fuelling station in Massachusetts is located at the Billerica, Massachusetts headquarters of fuel cell manufacturer Nuvera.  no publicly accessible stations were in operation in Massachusetts.

Michigan: In 2000, the Ford Motor Company and Air Products & Chemicals opened the first hydrogen station in North America in Dearborn, MI.   no publicly accessible stations were in operation in Michigan.

Missouri's only hydrogen filling station is located at the Missouri University of Science and Technology campus.  no publicly accessible stations were in operation in Missouri.

Ohio: A hydrogen filling station opened in 2007 on the campus of Ohio State University at the Center for Automotive Research. This station is the only one in Ohio.  no publicly accessible stations were in operation in Ohio.

Vermont: A hydrogen station was built in 2004 in Vermont in Burlington, Vermont, partially funded through the United States Department of Energy’s Hydrogen Program.  no publicly accessible stations were in operation in Vermont.

Oceania

Australia
In March 2021, the first Australian publicly available hydrogen fuel station opened in Canberra operated by ActewAGL.

Delivery methods 
Hydrogen fueling stations can be divided into off-site stations, where hydrogen is delivered by truck or pipeline, and on-site stations that produce and compress hydrogen for the vehicles. Another off-site concept, by Bioenergy Concept GmbH, which has not been commercialized, involves filling hydrogen in cartridges and transporting them to a filling station, where the empty cartridges are replaced with new ones. It is hoped that this process would save about 33% of energy (Kwh/KgH2) used by conventional transportation.

Types of recharging stations

Hydrogen highway 

A hydrogen highway is a chain of hydrogen-equipped filling stations and other infrastructure along a road or highway. Italy and Germany are collaborating to build a hydrogen highway between Mantua in northern Italy and Munich in southern Germany.

Home hydrogen fueling station 
Home hydrogen fueling stations are available to consumers.

Solar powered water electrolysing hydrogen home stations are composed of solar cells, power converter, water purifier, electrolyzer, piping, hydrogen purifier, oxygen purifier, compressor, pressure vessels and a hydrogen outlet.

Daily refueling capacity
The hydrogen refueling stations built by Hyundai Motor Group can typically refuel up to 70 Hyundai Nexo vehicles per day.

Disadvantages

Pollution
 98% of hydrogen is produced by steam methane reforming, which emits carbon dioxide. The bulk of hydrogen is also transported to fueling stations in trucks, so pollution is also emitted in its transportation.

Volatility
Hydrogen fuel is hazardous because of its low ignition energy, high combustion energy, and because it easily leaks from tanks. Explosions at hydrogen filling stations have been reported.

Supply
Hydrogen fuelling stations generally receive deliveries by truck from hydrogen suppliers. An interruption at a hydrogen supply facility can shut down multiple hydrogen fuelling stations due to an interruption of the supply of hydrogen.

Costs

There are far fewer Hydrogen filling stations than gasoline fuel stations, which in the US alone numbered 168,000 in 2004. Replacing the US gasoline infrastructure with hydrogen fuel infrastructure is estimated to cost a half trillion U.S. dollars. A hydrogen fueling station costs between $1 million and $4 million to build. In comparison, BEVs can charge at home or at public chargers. As of 2022, there are approximately 41,000 public charging stations in the United States, with more than 100,000 outlets. A public Level 2 charger, which comprise the vast majority of ChargePoint chargers in the US, costs about $2,000, while a DC fast charger can cost between $100,000 and $250,000.

See also 

 Cascade storage system
 HCNG dispenser
 Hydrogen vehicle
 Hydrogen production
 Hydrogen storage
 Hydrogen reformer
 Hydrogen piping
 Hydrogen leak testing
 Hydrogen sensor
 Autonomous building
 Microgeneration
 Virtual power plant

References

http://www.prweb.com/releases/2014/07/prweb12042788.htm

External links
 H2Map.com Map of hydrogen refueling stations in the UK
 H2stations.org Map of hydrogen refueling stations worldwide (GIS)
 California Fuel Cell Partnership Map Map of hydrogen fueling stations in California, with real-time status reports
 EUhyfis
 ISO-TC 197

Sustainable transport
Hydrogen infrastructure
Gas technologies
Industrial gases